Sandwich Islands was the name given to the Hawaiian Islands by James Cook in 1778.

Sandwich Island may also refer to:

 Manuae (Cook Islands), named Sandwich Island by Cook
 Efate in the Republic of Vanuatu, named Sandwich Island by Cook

Other uses
 Sandwich Island sleeper, a species of fish endemic to the Hawaiian Islands
 South Georgia and the South Sandwich Islands, part of the British territory of South Georgia and the South Sandwich Islands
 Sandwich Islets, south of Bahía Cook, Chile

See also